Rouzbeh Arghavan, born May 18, 1988) is a professional Iranian basketball player who currently plays for the national team. He started with the national youth team.  He is the second tallest player of Iran's national basketball team, who plays in basketball at central post.  In 2004, he entered the Iranian youth national basketball team, according to experts, he has an amazing combination of strength and speed, which makes him play a key role in 4 or 5 positions.  be  In addition to excellent attacks, he is a top defensive player who shows good defenses and rebounds.  He can create problems for other teams with his quick attacks and also returning to the defense.  He has also gained experience in 
World Cup 2014 and Incheon Asian Games.  Before basketball, he was a skilled swimmer who turned to basketball because of his physique A player who has experienced participating in the teams of Abu Muslim Mashhad, Azad University and Petrochemical and was able to perform in his first experience in the Asian Nations Cup.  To be satisfied, Arghvan is a very capable player who completed his bachelor's and master's degrees (applied physiology) at Tehran University.  He is a moral player.

References

Living people
Sportspeople from Mashhad
1988 births
Iranian men's basketball players
Asian Games silver medalists for Iran
Asian Games medalists in basketball
Basketball players at the 2014 Asian Games
Basketball players at the 2018 Asian Games
Centers (basketball)
Medalists at the 2014 Asian Games
Medalists at the 2018 Asian Games
Petrochimi Bandar Imam BC players
2014 FIBA Basketball World Cup players
20th-century Iranian people
21st-century Iranian people